Sargachromanols are a group of related chemical compounds isolated from the brown alga Sargassum siliquastrum.  At least 20 members of the class have been identified, named sargachromanol A through T.  Sargachromanol G has in vitro anti-inflammatory effects in isolated mouse macrophage cells.

References 

Brown algae
Chromanes